This article is about the particular significance of the year 1944 to Wales and its people.

Incumbents
Archbishop of Wales
Charles Green, Bishop of Bangor (died 7 May)
David Prosser, Bishop of St David's (elected)
Archdruid of the National Eisteddfod of Wales – Crwys

Events
22 January - Wynford Vaughan-Thomas reports for the BBC from the Battle of Anzio.
23 January - An RAF Halifax bomber crashes in the Elan Valley, killing nine crew.
28 March - Cardiff Blitz: Nine people are killed in an air raid on Cardiff.
11 April - An RAF Lancaster bomber crashes near Llanwrtyd Wells, killing eight crew.
16 August - Lt. Tasker Watkins leads a bayonet charge at Barfour in Normandy, winning the Victoria Cross for his courage.
17 October - The first "Welsh Day" debate takes place in the House of Commons (UK).
11 November - A US Dakota C-47 with four crew crashes into cliffs above Llyn Dulyn. 
10 December - American Liberty ship Dan Beard is torpedoed off Strumble Head, resulting in the deaths of 29 crew.
20 December - An American B-24 Liberator plane crashes into the sea off Anglesey, killing eight crew.
Plaid Cymru transfers its head office from Caernarfon to Cardiff.
Morgan Phillips becomes Secretary of the Labour Party (UK), a position he will hold until 1961.
Sir Thomas Williams Phillips becomes permanent secretary of the new government ministry created to implement the national insurance system.
Sir David Brunt is awarded the royal medal of the Royal Society for his work in meteorology.
Politician Goronwy Owen and naval architect Llewellyn Soulsby are knighted.

Arts and literature
2 October - Dylan Thomas is best man at the wedding of his friend and fellow poet Vernon Watkins in London - but fails to turn up.
BBC commentator Alun Williams marries Perrie Hopkin Morris, daughter of Sir Rhys Hopkin Morris.

Awards

National Eisteddfod of Wales (held in Llandybie)
National Eisteddfod of Wales: Chair - D. Lloyd Jenkins
National Eisteddfod of Wales: Crown - J. M. Edwards
National Eisteddfod of Wales: Prose Medal - withheld

New books

English language
Rhys Davies – Black Venus
Fred Hando - The Pleasant Land of Gwent
Jack Jones - The Man David
Alun Lewis - The Last Inspection
Sir Percy Emerson Watkins - A Welshman Remembers
Sir Ifor Williams - Lectures on early Welsh Poetry

Welsh language
Thomas Rowland Hughes - William Jones
Edward Morgan Humphreys - Ceulan y Llyn Du
T. H. Parry-Williams - O'r Pedwar Gwynt

New drama
James Kitchener Davies - Meini Gwagedd
Emlyn Williams - The Druid's Rest

Music
Harry Parr Davies - Jenny Jones (musical)
Grace Williams - Sea Sketches

Film
The Halfway House, starring Mervyn Johns, Glynis Johns and Rachel Thomas, is set in Wales.

Broadcasting
August - Wynford Vaughan-Thomas reports on the liberation of Paris for BBC radio.
Launch of the Noson Lawen series on BBC radio.

Visual arts
Polish-born expressionist painter Josef Herman begins 11 years living and working in Ystradgynlais.

Sport
Boxing - Syd Worgan beats Tommy Davies for the vacant Welsh featherweight title.
Football - The first post-war match between Wales and England ends in a 1 - 0 victory for Wales.

Births

21 January - Peter Rodrigues, footballer
17 February - Karl Jenkins, composer
1 March – Dai Morgan Evans, English-born archaeologist (died 2017)
6 March – Billy Raybould, Wales international rugby player
12 March – Tammy Jones, singer
24 March 
Mary Balogh, novelist
Steve Jones, biologist
31 March – Myfanwy Talog, actress (died 1995)
4 April – Ronnie Rees, footballer
8 April – Hywel Bennett, actor (died 2017)
15 April – Dave Edmunds, musician
16 April – Llew Smith, politician (died 2021)
5 May
Roger Rees, actor (died 2015 in the United States)
John Rhys-Davies, actor
20 May – Kathrin Thomas, magistrate
3 June – Dilwyn John, footballer
11 June – Alan Howarth, Baron Howarth of Newport, politician
16 June – Brian Protheroe, English-born singer and actor of Welsh parentage
7 July – Glenys Kinnock, politician
7 July – Angharad Rees, actress (died 2012)
31 July
Endaf Emlyn, TV presenter, musician and director
Betty Williams, politician
9 October - Desmond Barrit, actor
21 October - Mandy Rice-Davies, socialite (died 2014)
6 November - Gerallt Lloyd Owen, poet (died 2014)
14 November - Eurfyl ap Gwilym, economist and politician
29 November - Gareth Wardell, politician
18 December - (Roger) Deke Leonard, rock musician (died 2017)
24 December– Meirion Pennar, translator and son of Pennar Davies (died 2010)

Deaths

8 January - John Newell Evans, Welsh-born farmer and politician in Canada, 97
11 January - Richard Powell, Wales international rugby player, 79
5 March - Alun Lewis, poet, 28 (accidentally shot)
20 March - William Retlaw Williams, lawyer and historian, 80 or 81
31 March - Talfryn Evans, cricketer, 29 
7 May - Charles Green, Bishop of Monmouth, Bishop of Bangor and Archbishop of Wales, 79
17 May - John Lloyd Morgan, lawyer and MP, 83
24 May - Sir Herbert Williams-Wynn, 7th Baronet, politician, 83
27 May - Griffith Hartwell Jones, academic, 85
June - Dai Davies, footballer, 63/64
16 June - David Davies, 1st Baron Davies, philanthropist and MP, 64  
25 June - James Atkin, Baron Atkin, judge, 76
5 August - Maurice Turnbull, cricketer, 38 (killed in action)
5 August - Ethel Lina White, crime novelist, 68
20 September - Oliver Morris, rugby player and footballer, 27 (killed in action)
21 September - Bob Jones, rugby union player, 69
25 September - David Davies, 2nd Baron Davies, 29 (killed in battle)
30 September- David Harris Davies, Wales international rugby union player, 66
5 October - Laura Evans-Williams, singer, 61
27 October - Clem Lewis, rugby player, 54
19 November - Watkin Williams, Bishop of Bangor, 99
8 December - Sir William Jenkins, MP for Neath, 73

See also
1944 in Northern Ireland

References

 
 Wales